Po' Monkey's was a juke joint in unincorporated Bolivar County, Mississippi, United States, outside of Merigold. The juke joint was founded in the early 1960s and was one of the last rural juke joints in the Mississippi Delta. It ceased operating after the death of operator Willie "Po' Monkey" Seaberry in 2016.

The shack was originally sharecroppers' quarters. The building is made of tin and plywood, held together by nails, staples, and wires, loosely fashioned and made by Seaberry. The low ceilings of the joint were lined with Christmas lights, naked babydolls, street signs, wrapping paper, disco balls, and dozens of stuffed-animal monkeys. The outside of the joint features a sign reading: "No Loud Music, No Dope Smoking, No Rap Music."  Po' Monkey's was operated by Seaberry until his death in 2016. He also had a life estate in the property itself, meaning that he owned it during his lifetime. Upon his death, ownership of the property (but not the building's contents) reverted to the Hiter family.

Po' Monkey's was an incubator for the Delta Blues scene. By the 1990s, Po' Monkey's was attracting a conglomeration of college students, migrating from Delta State University, located in Cleveland, Mississippi, to juke joint pundits.  In the 2000s, it housed in a raunchier crowd filled with dirty dancing , strippers, and $2 cans of beer. In 2009, the Mississippi Blues Commission placed a historic marker at the Po Monkey's Lounge in 2009 designating it as a site on the Mississippi Blues Trail for its contribution to the development of the blues (and being one of the few authentic juke joints then operating).

Seaberry was best known for his strangely coordinated outfits of wildly exotic pantsuits . He could be seen sneaking out of bar room, into a bedroom offset of the drinking quarters, only to reappear in a new pantsuit.  Billy Nowell, the mayor of nearby Cleveland, Mississippi at the time of Seaberry's death, called Seaberry a "positive influence" on Bolivar County. Seaberry was found dead on July 14, 2016. Po' Monkey's ceased operating after Seaberry's death, and the contents of the building were sold at auction to Shonda Warner.

References

Further reading

Buildings and structures in Mississippi
Buildings and structures in Bolivar County, Mississippi
Tourist attractions in Bolivar County, Mississippi